Jang Sok-chol (born 17 August 1975) is a North Korean former footballer. He represented North Korea on at least fifteen occasions between 2004 and 2005.

Career statistics

International

References

1975 births
Living people
North Korean footballers
North Korea international footballers
Association football defenders